Nelly Chávez (born 17 December 1945) is a Bolivian long-distance runner. She competed in the women's marathon at the 1984 Summer Olympics. Chávez finished sixth in the marathon at the 1987 Pan American Games. She was the first woman to represent Bolivia at the Olympics.

References

1945 births
Living people
Athletes (track and field) at the 1984 Summer Olympics
Bolivian female long-distance runners
Bolivian female marathon runners
Olympic athletes of Bolivia
Athletes (track and field) at the 1987 Pan American Games
Pan American Games competitors for Bolivia
Place of birth missing (living people)